Dawnn Jewel Lewis (born August 13, 1961) is an American actress. Lewis is best known for her role as Jaleesa Vinson–Taylor on the NBC television sitcom A Different World from the series beginning in 1987 until the end of its fifth season in 1992, in addition to co-writing the opening theme for the series.

Lewis's other notable roles include portraying Robin Dumars on the ABC sitcom Hangin' with Mr. Cooper for its first season (1992–93) and as Cheryl Spade in the 1988 film I'm Gonna Git You Sucka. Since then, Lewis has appeared in numerous TV series, including other sitcoms, and has also performed on stage.

Early life and education
Dawnn Lewis was born on August 13, 1961 in Brooklyn, New York City, to Carl and Joyce Lewis, who are of African-American and Guyanese descent, She began singing at the age of four and acting at eleven. At sixteen, Lewis graduated from the High School of Music & Art in New York City, now known as Fiorello H. LaGuardia High School. In college, she majored in musical theatre with a minor in journalism, graduating with a Bachelor of Music degree, cum laude, from the University of Miami in Coral Gables, Florida, in 1982.

Career

The Tap Dance Kid National Tour (1985-1986)
From August 1, 1985, to July 6, 1986, Lewis performed and understudied in the National Tour of the Broadway musical The Tap Dance Kid under the name "Dawnn J. Lewis".

A Different World (1987–1992)
Lewis appeared for the first five of the six-season run as Jaleesa Vinson (later Vinson–Taylor) from 1987 until 1992. Lewis co-wrote the theme song to A Different World, with Bill Cosby and Stu Gardner, and co-performed the song for the first season. In A Different World, Although her character was married to another of the main characters on the show, her character disappeared from A Different World without explanation, like Chuck Cunningham of Happy Days. Lewis appeared in a special week-long segment of A Different World called the Hillman College Reunion airing on Nick at Nite, along with Lisa Bonet, Jasmine Guy, Kadeem Hardison, Darryl M. Bell, Cree Summer, and Sinbad. On her Super Password appearance in 1988, she was paired with Dallas star Ken Kercheval, not any of her co-stars.

Hangin' with Mr. Cooper (1992–1993)
In September 1992, Lewis began starring in ABC's Hangin' with Mr. Cooper alongside Mark Curry and Holly Robinson. Lewis appeared in 20 of the 22 episodes of the first season as Robin Dumars, Mark's childhood best friend and roommate. Lewis did not appear on the two shows concurrently – she left A Different World to star in Hangin' with Mr. Cooper. Lewis and Holly Robinson, along with R&B quartet En Vogue, performed the theme song for season one of Hangin' with Mr. Cooper. Sometime before the end of season one, the show producers decided to scale back on the updated version of the 1970s ABC sitcom Three's Company concept. Lewis left the show after the conclusion of the first season due to the producers deciding to change the direction of the show, replacing her character with a mother and child; Mark's cousin Geneva Lee (portrayed by Saundra Quarterman) and her daughter Nicole (portrayed by Raven-Symoné).

Other work

Lewis provided additional voices in the video game, True Crime: New York City. She portrayed Deloris Van Cartier in Peter Schneider's Sister Act the Musical, which opened at the Pasadena Playhouse on October 24, 2006. Lewis has voiced Storm of the X-Men in three games, most recently Marvel: Ultimate Alliance 2. She also voiced Granny Grim on The Grim Adventures of Billy and Mandy, and voiced the female Shokan (Sheeva) in Mortal Kombat: Defenders of the Realm. Lewis has also done voice work as LaBarbara Conrad, wife of Hermes Conrad, in the animated TV series Futurama, Detective Terri Lee on Spider-Man: The Animated Series, villainess Di Archer on Bruno the Kid, and voiced a number of characters on The Boondocks. Additionally, she voiced the character Sharona on King of the Hill.

Lewis co-starred in two Disney Channel Original Movies, The Poof Point as Marigold Ballord, and as Gail DeBarge in Let It Shine. In 2000, Lewis played Blabberwort the Troll in the five-episode NBC miniseries The 10th Kingdom.

2006–present
In 2006, Lewis starred as Melba Early in the film adaptation of Dreamgirls. Lewis released her debut CD, entitled Worth Waiting For, in 2006. She played Addaperle in The Wiz with New York City Center's Encores! In 2009, Lewis played Denise Fields on One Tree Hill. In 2010, Lewis played a minor recurring role as Lauren's mother in The Secret Life of the American Teenager. In 2012, she voiced Malora in Strange Frame. She also appeared as Dr. Knapp on Days of Our Lives in 2012–2013. In 2014 Lewis starred in The Divorce along with Vanessa Bell Calloway, Tatyana Ali & Freda Payne. As of 2015, Lewis is playing a recurring role on Major Crimes as Patrice, a love interest for Lt. Provenza, whom he met during a case. In that same year, she also voiced Ruby's mother Helen Hanshaw in one episode of Sofia The First.

In March 2016, Lewis was cast in Disney Junior's animated series Doc McStuffins as the voice of Grandma McStuffins.
In 2017 she provided the voice of Maybelle Mundy in the film Bunyan and Babe. In 2018 she began voicing Fannie Granger on DreamWorks's Spirit Riding Free and Dr. Jones in Stretch Armstrong and the Flex Fighters, while in 2019 began voicing The Chief on Netflix's animated Carmen Sandiego. She voiced Attorney General's special agent Lenora Carter in The Simpsons episode "The Fat Blue Line" in 2019, and became the voice of Bernice Hibbert starting with "Uncut Femmes" in 2021.

On November 7, 2019, Lewis began portraying Zelma, Tina Turner's mother in Tina on Broadway and working under the name "Dr. Dawnn Lewis."

From August 2020 she stars as the voice of Captain Carol Freeman in the animated series Star Trek: Lower Decks.

From 2021 to 2022, Lewis voiced Ms. Jackie Washington, the Neighborhood Council President of Hansberry Heights, in the animated series Karma's World.

Lewis is an honorary member of Zeta Phi Beta sorority.

Filmography

Film

Television

Video games

Album appearances
 Vanessa Williams – The Right Stuff, on the song "If You Really Love Him"
 Take 6 – So Much 2 Say, on the interlude "That's The Law"
 D-Nice – Call Me D-Nice, on the song "It's Over"

References

External links

 
"Different World" Star Dawnn Lewis to Get Into the Habit for Sister Act The Musical Playbill. Retrieved 2006-09-24

1961 births
Living people
Actresses from New York City
African-American actresses
American film actresses
American people of Guyanese descent
American television actresses
American video game actresses
American voice actresses
People from Brooklyn
The High School of Music & Art alumni
University of Miami Frost School of Music alumni
20th-century American actresses
21st-century American actresses
20th-century African-American women
20th-century African-American people
21st-century African-American women
21st-century African-American people